Pope Michael may refer to:

Coptic Orthodox Popes of Alexandria:
 Pope Michael I of Alexandria (743–767)
 Pope Michael II of Alexandria (849–851)
 Pope Michael III of Alexandria (880–907)
 Pope Michael IV of Alexandria (1092–1102)
 Pope Michael V of Alexandria (1145–1146)
 Pope Michael VI of Alexandria (1475–1477)

Other:
 David Bawden, an American who claimed the Roman Catholic papacy (1990–2022) under the papal name Michael